Notable bands and musicians within the Palm Desert Scene include the following:

Scene musicians 

 Gary Arce
 Bob Balch
 Brant Bjork
 Joey Castillo
 Dave Catching
 Al Cisneros
 Chris Cockrell
 Fred Drake
 Dean Fertita
 John Garcia
 Eddie Glass
 Chris Goss
 Chris Hakius
 Matt Helders
 Alfredo Hernández
 Scott Hill
 Josh Homme
 Jesse Hughes
 Alain Johannes
 Larry Lalli
 Mario Lalli
 Mark Lanegan
 John McBain
 Brian O'Connor
 Nick Oliveri
 Matt Pike
 Ted Quinn
 Scott Reeder (bassist)
 Scott Reeder (drummer)
 Ruben Romano
 Pete Stahl
 Bill Stinson
 Tony Tornay
 Gene Trautmann
 Troy Van Leeuwen

Bands 

 Across the River
 Big Scenic Nowhere
 Brant Bjork and the Bros
 Brant Bjork and the Low Desert Punk Band
 Ché
 CRX
 Dali's Llama
 Desert Sessions
 Eagles of Death Metal
 Earthless
 earthlings?
 Fatso Jetson
 Fu Manchu
 Gone Is Gone
 Gram Rabbit
 Hermano
 John Garcia and the Band of Gold
 Karma to Burn
 Kyuss
 Masters of Reality
 Mondo Generator
 Nebula
 Orquesta del Desierto
 The Post Pop Depression Band
 Queens of the Stone Age
 Sleep
 Slo Burn
 Stöner
 Ten East
 Thin White Rope
 Throw Rag
 Unida
 Vista Chino
 Yawning Man
 Yawning Sons

References

Stoner rock
Music scenes
Musical subcultures
Music of California